Mahoma Mwaungulu  (3 January 1932 Tanzania - 2004 Berlin) was a Pan African politician. He was one of the major leaders in the German-African community before and after the reunification of Germany.

Biography

Early life and education
Mahoma Mwaungulu was born on 3 January 1932 in the former British colony of Tanganyika, now known as Tanzania, the son of two Ngonde from Nyasaland, now known as Malawi. He carried the traditional hereditary title of Mwakipunda, as a member of the council of nobles responsible for choosing the king of Malawi from among a number of eligible members of traditional royal families.

Mwaungulu became politically active in his student days in Africa. He was imprisoned for a year for being part of a resistance movement in Southern Rhodesia, (now Zimbabwe). As a member of the Youth League of the Nyasaland African Congress, he received a recommendation to study in Ghana, and he subsequently crossed the continent on foot from Tanzania to Ghana to meet Kwame Nkrumah and George Padmore. He received a stipend to study in the German Democratic Republic, and from 1960 to 1964 he studied economics at Leipzig, at the Karl Marx University. As a student, he remained engaged in African politics and headed the African student party. Shortly after finishing his exams and before leaving to the newly independent Malawi, a racist assault was committed on him by three German students. It is documented in a German publication on migration in the GDR.

Political activity in Africa
After completing his education, he was invited to return to Malawi to work as an economist for the Hastings Banda government. During this time, he was active in the Pan African liberation fight against colonialism. He met Che Guevara during his venture in the Democratic Republic of the Congo. As a result of the Malawian cabinet crisis which turned Malawi into a dictatorship, he was later placed under house arrest and the Banda regime planned his murder, but he was able to escape to Tanzania with the aid of friends, and later returned to the East Germany where he settled in 1967.

Political activity in the German Democratic Republic (GDR)
Mwaungulu returned to the GDR as a member of the steering committee of the Socialist League of Malawi (LESOMA), the most important oppositional Malawian party led by Attati Mkapati. The party was founded in Tanzania by Yatuta Chisiza, another exiled member of the former Malawian cabinet. Out of his own exile in the GDR, Mwaungulu became the representative of LESOMA for Eastern Europe and organized their support by the solidarity-committee of the GDR. At least two editions of "Kuchanso", the political program of LESOMA, were printed in East Berlin and transferred from there to Tanzania, from where it was smuggled into Malawi. But the GDR stopped the support at the end of the 1970th, probably because of its economic cooperation with Mozambique. Holding on to his political ideals, the GDR had to expel Mwaungulu from her territory in 1982 to keep him from political action. Up from this moment he became the representative of LESOMA in Western Europe. He also forced juridically the West German government to recognize him as the first Malawian refugee of Western Germany, a country that supported the Banda-Regime. In East Berlin he had also written on his doctoral thesis. He could not finish it because the GDR canceled his stipend.

Community activities in Berlin-Kreuzberg
He worked, taught and held speeches in several circumstances in both the GDR and in the Federal Republic of Germany. He married a German woman, and had three children.

In the late 1980s Mwaungulu became critical of the East German government and moved to West Berlin. There he lived in the multicultural Kreuzberg district and continued working for the integration of Africans and other migrants into German society. Cosmopolitan as he was, his comment on the increasing racism in the reunited Germany found its way into a Malaysian newspaper: "East Germany made it a crime to even be a racist. When the communists went away, so did that law. In West Germany, I don`t know. I think the government has always tolerated racism." In 1997, he co-founded the Pan-African Forum e.V with Wilfred Imoudu, another Pan African intellectual and activist who had studied in the GDR in the 1960s, and was the son of an important Nigerian trade unionist.

Mwaungulu died in 2004 at the age of 72, in the Urban Krankenhaus in Berlin Kreuzberg. During the Berlin Black History Month in 2009, a tribute to his memory was made by school friend and compatriot, Knollys Mwanyongo, and by Wilfred Imoudu.

References

Further reading
 Pampuch, Sebastian: Afrikanische Migrationserfahrungen mit zwei deutschen Staaten. Rekonstruktion eines migratorischen Lebensweges über die Grenze zweier deutscher Staaten hinweg. Magisterarbeit, Institut für Europäische Ethnologie, Humboldt-Universität zu Berlin 2008
 Pampuch, Sebastian: "Ein malawischer Exilant im geteilten Berlin: Mahoma Mwakipunda Mwaungulu." In: Diallo, Oumar/Zeller, Joachim (ed.): Black Berlin. Die deutsche Metropole und ihre afrikanische Diaspora in Geschichte und Gegenwart. Metropol-Verlag Berlin 2013, p. 151-157
 Theuerkauf, Inger: "Die Schule ist meine Frau. Eine Lebensgeschichte von Mahoma M. Mwaungulu." In: Schmidt, Heike (ed.): Afrika Erinnern - Hauptseminar Mündliche Geschichte. Institut für Afrika- und Asienwissenschaften, Humboldt-Universität zu Berlin 2000

External links
 Brief history of Africans in Germany Introduction.pdf
 "Partners in International Socialist Solidarity or just Guest workers: Africans in the Former German Democratic Republic (DDR)" - Prof. John W. Long (Chicago) in : Black European Studies in Transnational Perspective - Conference Reader - 2nd International, Interdisciplinary Conference July 27 – 30, 2006 (Berlin, Germany)
 Tribute to M. Mwaungulu at Black History Month 2009, Berlin
 Interview with M. Mwaungulu in: Black People/ Black Berlin, Documentary, Germany 1994 by Fountainhead Tanz Theatre
 "Turks simmering over arson attacks", New Straits Times,11.27.1992, p. 37

1932 births
2004 deaths
German pan-Africanists
Malawian pan-Africanists
Malawian emigrants to Germany
Immigrants to East Germany
Malawian escapees
Escapees from Malawian detention
Malawian exiles